Cosmas I of Constantinople, (? – after 1081) was Patriarch of Constantinople from 2 August 1075 to 8 May 1081.

Biography
Originally from Antioch, Cosmas was educated and resided in Jerusalem for a large part of his life, earning his geographic epithet. He may have been appointed to the patriarchate out of a monastery near or in Jerusalem.

He crowned the Byzantine Emperor Nikephoros III Botaneiates. He disapproved of Nikephoros' marriage to the ex-wife of the previous Emperor Michael VII but took no further action than degrading the priest who performed the service. Later he used his influence to try to convince him to resign as his popularity declined and the empire entered a period of instability.

Cosmas likewise crowned Alexios I Komnenos in 1081. When Alexios attempted to repudiate his wife Irene Doukaina to marry the ex-empress Maria of Alania, Cosmas successfully blocked the move as she had already been twice married.  Cosmas resigned or was forced out soon after, as Alexios' mother, Anna Dalassene, disliked Irene's link to the Doukas family and resented this interference. She further pressed for the resignation as she wished to place her favourite on the patriarchal throne, which she achieved with the appointment of the ill-educated Eustratius Garidas. According to Anna Komnene, Cosmas resigned voluntarily on the condition that he be allowed to crown Irene empress first, which he did and then left.

The most important synodal action taken by Cosmas was the condemnation, in 1076–1077, of certain heretical views taken by John Italos, a scholar connected to the Doukas family.  In a more general sense, Cosmas' retirement is said to mark a period where, between Alexios I and the emperor Manuel I Komnenos, the Church was moved to a position of dependence on, identification with, and subservience to the state, reversing the greater self-determination the Church had exercised through the eleventh century. The historian John Skylitzes (continuatus) speaks poorly of Cosmas, suggesting that the emperor selected him for his lack of greatness, writing that after the death of the previous patriarch, Michael VII "chose another, not from those of the senate, nor from those of the Great Church, nor any other of the Byzantines famed for word and deed, but a certain monk Cosmas sprung from the Holy City, and honoured by the Emperor... although he was without wisdom or taste...."

He was proclaimed a saint by the Orthodox Church, with his feast day on 2 January (new calendar).

Sources
Buckler, Georgina. Anna Komnena: A Study. Oxford: University Press, 1929.
J.M. Hussey. The Orthodox Church in the Byzantine Empire. Oxford: University Press, 1986.
Paul Magdalino. The Empire of Manuel Komnenos. Cambridge: University Press, 1993.
John Julius Norwich. "Byzantium: The Decline and Fall". (New York: Alfred A. Knopf, 1996) p. 7.

References

11th-century patriarchs of Constantinople
Year of birth unknown
Year of death unknown
People from Antioch
Eastern Orthodox saints